Oleg Gennadyevich Sentsov (born 13 July 1976) is a Ukrainian filmmaker, writer, and activist from Crimea. Sentsov has directed the feature films Gamer (2011),  (2019, co-directed with Akhtem Seitablayev), and Rhino (2021). 

Following the Russian annexation of Crimea, he was arrested in Crimea in May 2014 and sentenced to 20 years' imprisonment by a Russian court in August 2015 on charges of plotting terrorism. The conviction was described as fabricated by Amnesty International and others. He was awarded the European Parliament’s Sakharov Prize in 2018. On 7 September 2019, he was released in a prisoner swap between Russia and Ukraine.

Biography

Early life and film career
Sentsov was born on 13 July 1976 in Simferopol, Crimean Oblast, Ukrainian SSR. He is an ethnic Russian. From 1993 to 1998, he was an economics student in Kyiv and later took courses in film directing and screenwriting in Moscow. His first two short movies were A Perfect Day for Bananafish (2008) and The Horn of a Bull (2009). Gamer, his first feature, debuted at the Rotterdam International Film Festival in 2012. Its success in this and other festivals helped him secure funding for Rhino. It was scheduled to begin shooting in the summer of 2014, but production was postponed due to his participation in the AutoMaidan and Euromaidan protest movements. 

During the 2014 Crimean crisis, he helped deliver food and supplies to Ukrainian military servicemen trapped in their Crimean bases. Sentsov has stated that he does not recognize the Russian annexation of Crimea.

Trial and imprisonment

Arrest and detention
Sentsov was arrested on 11 May 2014 in Crimea on suspicion of "plotting terrorist acts". With Gennady Afanasyev, Alexei Chirniy, and Alexander Kolchenko, he became one of four Ukrainian citizens held by Russia's Federal Security Service, who accused them of seeking to carry out terrorist attacks on bridges, power lines, and public monuments in the Crimean cities of Simferopol, Yalta, and Sevastopol. These charges were punishable with up to 20 years in prison.

After holding Sentsov without charges for three weeks, the Federal Security Service accused the four Ukrainians of being "part of a terrorist community, to carry out explosions with home-made devices on May 9, 2014 near the Eternal Flame memorial and Lenin monument in Simferopol and to set fire to the offices of the Russian Community of Crimea public organization and the United Russia party branch in Simferopol on April 14 and April 18, 2014". The four were also accused of membership in Ukraine's nationalist paramilitary group, Right Sector, a claim that both Sentsov and Right Sector denied. Russian prosecutors stated that Sentsov confessed to the terrorist plots. Sentsov denied this and stated that he had been beaten and threatened with rape to force his confession. According to Sentsov's lawyers, investigators refused to open a case on his allegations of torture, suggesting that his bruises were self-inflicted and that he was keen on sado-masochism.

Starting on 19 May 2014, Sentsov was detained in Moscow's Lefortovo prison. On 7 July 2014, Sentsov's arrest was extended to 11 October. In October 2014, his arrest was again extended to 11 January 2015.

Ukrainian authorities were banned by their Russian counterparts from contacting or helping Sentsov. According to Sentsov, he was deprived of his Ukrainian citizenship.

Trial

Sentsov went on trial for terrorism in Russia on 21 July 2015 among international outcry.

The main witness for the prosecution, Afanasyev, retracted his testimony in court on 31 July, saying it was given under duress. According to the Afanasyev's lawyer, Afanasyev was tortured, including with electric current. The other main witness, Oleksiy Chirnyi, refused to testify in court.

A Russian court in Rostov-on-Don sentenced Sentsov to 20 years in prison on 25 August.

Detention
Sentsov initially served his sentence in the Russian federal subject Sakha Republic. In October 2016, Russia refused to extradite Sentsov to Ukraine, claiming that he was a Russian citizen. In September 2017, he was transferred to Russia's northernmost prison, the Labytnangi Penal Colony in the Yamalo-Nenets Autonomous Okrug. He declined visits by his family after observing that once the visitors leave other prisoners "fall into terrible deep depression". On 14 May 2018, he went on an open-ended hunger strike protesting the incarceration of all Ukrainian political prisoners in Russia and demanding their release. After 145 days of the hunger strike, he ended it due to health concerns and the threat of force feeding.

Reactions

Ukraine
According to the Ombudsperson of Ukraine Valeriya Lutkovska, the decision of the Rostov court toward Ukrainians Sentsov and Oleksandr Kolchenko constituted discrimination based on national origin.

Ukraine's Foreign Ministry, in a statement on its website, called the trial "a judicial farce".

Russia

On 26 June 2014, Russia's Presidential Council for Human Rights appealed to Deputy Prosecutor General Viktor Grin to review the circumstances surrounding the arrests of Sentsov and fellow activist Oleksandr Kolchenko. A reply, posted on the council's website, stated prosecutors found "no grounds" for altering the detention of either suspect.

More than 60 members of the Russian PEN center and several major Russian filmmakers expressed their support, including Nikita Mikhalkov, Andrey Zvyagintsev, and Alexander Sokurov.

The Memorial Human Rights Center declared that Sentsov and Kolchenko were political prisoners in Russia.

International
The European Union and the United States condemned Sentsov's detention and called for his release.

The European Union's High Representative for Foreign Affairs and Security Policy Federica Mogherini stated that "the EU considers the case to be in breach of international law and elementary standards of justice".

Western governments, Amnesty International, and European Film Academy deputy chairman Mike Downey described the proceedings as a show trial. The Commission on Security and Cooperation in Europe recognized Sentsov as a political prisoner.

The United States called the sentencing a "miscarriage of justice", stating that "Mr. Sentsov and Mr. Kolchenko were targeted by authorities because of their opposition to Russia’s attempted annexation of Crimea". Saying that Sentsov and Kolchenko were "taken hostage on Ukrainian territory", it called upon the Russian Federation to "implement the commitments it made in signing the Minsk agreements by immediately releasing Sentsov, Kolchenko, Savchenko, and all other remaining hostages".

The German government's special envoy for human rights and humanitarian affairs said in a statement that he was "shaken" by the severity of the sentences and urged Russia to comply with Council of Europe norms for the humane treatment of prisoners.

European film directors Agnieszka Holland, Ken Loach, Mike Leigh, and Pedro Almodóvar co-signed a 10 June 2014 letter by the European Film Academy to Russian authorities, demanding that the charges against Sentsov be dropped and the allegations of torture investigated. Iranian film director Mohsen Makhmalbaf dedicated his acceptance of the 2015 Robert Bresson Prize at the Venice Film Festival to Sentsov, calling the conviction a "major injustice" and the sentence "a move to intimidate all Russian society, especially the intellectuals and artists".

The European Parliament supported a resolution calling for the immediate release of Sentsov and other Ukrainian political prisoners. Before the vote, all major political groups in the European Parliament, when discussing the human rights situation in Russia, called for the release of Sentsov and 158 other political prisoners held in the country. The participants in the debate stressed the need to continue sanctions pressure on the Kremlin, and European leaders and diplomats were urged not to attend the World Cup, which opened 14 June in Russia.

The Sejm of Poland adopted a resolution on 15 June 2018 demanding the release of Ukrainians imprisoned in Russia for political reasons. In the resolution deputies demanded, in particular, the release of Sentsov, Kolchenko, and Sushchenko.

Sentsov was granted the title of honorary citizen of Paris on 24 September 2018. Sentsov was awarded the European Parliament’s Sakharov Prize on 25 October 2018, in a move described by The Guardian as an EU rebuke to Russian President Vladimir Putin.

In November 2018, the UN General Assembly adopted a resolution which called for the urgent release of Ukrainian citizens Sentsov, Volodymyr Balukh, and Emir-Usein Kuku.

Release

In August 2019, Sentsov was moved from an Arctic prison to a jail in Moscow amid talks of prisoner swaps. On 7 September 2019, in a prisoner swap with Ukraine, Russia released Sentsov. On that same day he returned to Kyiv, where he and other returning prisoners were welcomed by Ukrainian president Volodymyr Zelensky and where Sentsov reunited with his family.

The swap and release of prisoners was welcomed by American, French, and German leaders and leaders of international organizations such as NATO, OSCE, and the European Parliament.

Life and career after release
Sentsov's film Nomera (The Numbers) was shown at the 70th Berlin International Film Festival in 2020. The film was produced while Sentsov was still in prison. During this time he corresponded with his co-director Seitablayev.

During the 2022 Russian invasion of Ukraine, Sentsov joined the Territorial Defense Forces of Kyiv, which is a part of the Armed Forces of Ukraine. He called on the international film community to boycott Russian cinema.

Works

Films

Books 
 Non-fiction prose
 Купите книгу — она смешная ("Buy the book, it is funny", 2014)
 Рассказы ("Tales". Kyiv: Laurus, 2015)
 Life Went on Anyway (2019)

 Fiction plays
 Номера (Numbers) — playwright.

Family
Sentsov has three children. On July 5, 2022, he married Veronika Velch, the senior director at Ridgely Walsh and an activist of Euromaidan SOS.

Awards 
 Order for Courage, first class (24 September 2015) – for personal courage and dedication shown in defending the constitutional rights and freedoms of man, the integrity of the Ukrainian state
 Taras Shevchenko National Prize of Ukraine 2016 for Gamer and Rhino (presented in person in 2019)
 The Sakharov Award for Courage
 European Memory and Conscience Platform Award (14 November 2018)
 Serhiy Magnitsky International Prize for Investigative Journalism and Human Rights in the World (16 November 2018; presented in person on 14 November 2019)
 Pro Dignitate Humana Award (23 October 2018)
 Neptune Award of the Solidarity of Arts Festival in Gdańsk (23 August 2019)
 Stanisław Vincenz City Award in Kraków (2020)

See also
 Iryna Dovhan
 Eston Kohver
 Nadiya Savchenko

Notes

References

External links
 Russia is holding over 70 Ukrainian Political Prisoners of War 
 List of Individuals Recognized as Political Prisoners by the Human Rights Centre Memorial and Persecuted in connection with the Realization of their Right to Freedom of Religion as of 29 October 2017 
 , a documentary by Hromadske.TV

Living people
1976 births
People from Simferopol
Kyiv National Economic University alumni
Ukrainian film directors
People of the Euromaidan
Pro-Ukrainian people of the 2014 pro-Russian unrest in Ukraine
People of the annexation of Crimea by the Russian Federation
Ukrainian exiles of the annexation of Crimea by the Russian Federation
2014 controversies
Prisoners and detainees of Russia
Ukrainian people imprisoned abroad
Ukrainian people taken hostage
People convicted on terrorism charges
Ukrainian victims of human rights abuses
Ukrainian torture victims
Hunger strikers
Sakharov Prize laureates
Political prisoners according to Memorial
Ukrainian people of Russian descent
Territorial Defense Forces of Ukraine personnel
Ukrainian military personnel of the 2022 Russian invasion of Ukraine
Honorary citizens of Paris